The Fukuoka Masjid Al Nour Islamic Culture Center (Fukuoka Mosque)(アン　ヌール　イスラム文化センター　福岡マスジド) is the first mosque on the island of Kyūshū in Japan. It was built in 2009, and officially opened on 12 April 2009. Fukuoka Mosque aims to serve about 1,000 Muslims in Fukuoka Prefecture, as well to serve people in Japan interested in Islam. It arranges daily prayers, Friday prayers, Eid prayers on regular basis. It occasionally, arranges program for conversion into Islam, Muslim marriage, and funeral prayers.

Fukuoka Masjid is open for any non-Muslims as well. Non-Muslims can enter the mosque to watch prayers, discuss with others various Islamic and cultural issues, and collect introductory booklets on Islam. They are also allowed to attend Muslim prayers, if they wish.

The cultural wing of the mosque offers weekend Arabic language lessons for kids, women and men, cooking classes once every three months. It also arranges seminars and dialogue sessions occasionally.

Kyushu University Muslim Student Association (KUMSA) initiated the idea of building a mosque in 1998, and started collecting donations. In 2006, land was purchased, and construction plan was started. After a series of discussions with neighbors, the construction was started in 2008, and it took almost one year to finish. The first floor is mainly set for the men's prayer room, the second floor is the women's prayer room. On the basement level, there is a multi-purpose hall, a library, and a kitchen. The third floor has classrooms and a kitchen.

It is located in Hakozaki, Higashi-ku in the city of Fukuoka, just a one-minute walk from the west exit of JR Hakozaki Station.

See also
Kobe Mosque
Tokyo Camii
Islam in Japan
List of mosques in Asia

External links

 

2009 establishments in Japan
Buildings and structures in Fukuoka
Mosques in Japan
Mosques completed in 2009